Allan's lerista (Lerista allanae), also known commonly as Allan's skink and the greater robust fine-lined slider, is a species of skink, a lizard in the family Scincidae. This rare species is endemic to Queensland, Australia.

Etymology
The specific name, allanae, is in honor of "Mrs. P.C. Allan" who presented many interesting specimens to the Queensland Museum.

Habitat
The preferred natural habitat of L. allanae is forest.

Description
L. allanae has its limbs much reduced. It has no front legs, and each of its back legs has only one digit. The digit bears a claw. 

Reproduction
L. allanae is oviparous.

Conservation status
L. allanae is listed as "critically endangered" under the IUCN Red List, and as "endangered" on Queensland's Nature Conservation Act 1992.

References

Further reading
Cogger HG (2014). Reptiles and Amphibians of Australia, Seventh Edition. Clayton, Victoria, Australia: CSIRO Publishing. xxx + 1,033 pp. .
Greer AE (1967). "A New Generic Arrangement for some Australian Scincid Lizards". Breviora (267): 1–19. (Lerista allanae, new combination, p. 19).
Longman HA (1937). "Herpetological Notes". Memoirs of the Queensland Museum 11: 165–168. (Rhodona allanae, new species, p. 167).
Wilson S, Swan G (2013). A Complete Guide to Reptiles of Australia, Fourth Edition. Sydney: New Holland Publishers. 522 pp. .

Lerista
Skinks of Australia
Reptiles of Queensland
Endemic fauna of Australia
Nature Conservation Act endangered biota
Reptiles described in 1937
Taxa named by Albert Heber Longman
Taxonomy articles created by Polbot